Aluminium borohydride, also known as aluminium tetrahydroborate, (in American English, aluminum borohydride and aluminum tetrahydroborate, respectively) is the chemical compound with the formula Al(BH4)3. It is a volatile pyrophoric liquid which is used as a reducing agent in laboratories. Unlike most other metal–borohydrides, which are ionic structures, aluminium borohydride is a covalent compound.

Preparation
Aluminium borohydride is formed by the reaction between sodium borohydride with aluminium chloride:
3 NaBH4 + AlCl3 → Al(BH4)3 + 3 NaCl

or as the non-pyrophoric tetrahydrofuran (THF) adduct, by the analogous reaction of calcium borohydride and aluminium chloride in THF:

 3 Ca(BH4)2 + 2 AlCl3 → 3 CaCl2 + 2 Al(BH4)3

Reactions
Like all borohydrides, this compound is a reducing agent and hydride donor. It reacts with water to give elemental hydrogen gas, and reduces carboxylic esters, aldehydes, and ketones to alcohols.

References

Further reading
 
 

Aluminium compounds
Borohydrides
Reducing agents